William O'Leary is the name of:

 William O'Leary (actor)
 William O'Leary (Irish politician)
 William O'Leary (British Army officer)
 William Hagarty O'Leary, 1874–1880, Member of Parliament
 William James O'Leary, New Zealand prospector